Edward Lloyd Klepfer was a spitball pitcher in Major League Baseball who played for the New York Yankees, Chicago White Sox and Cleveland Indians in a span of six seasons between 1911 and 1919.

Klepfer, commonly known as "Big Ed", was born on March 17, 1888, in Summerville, Pennsylvania. He batted and threw right-handed and was also , 180 pounds, and attended Penn State University.

Klepfer made his big league debut on  July 4, 1911, with the Highlanders. His career was chopped up due to time spent fighting in World War I, as part of the American Expeditionary Forces in France. At one time in his war fighting tenure, he was gassed.

Perhaps the most extraordinary part of his career was his second to last season-1917. He went 14–4 with a 2.37 ERA in 213 innings. He finished his career with a 22–17 record and a 2.98 ERA in 98 games.

Even though Klepfer was a fairly productive pitcher, he will still go down in history as one of the worst hitters (pitcher or otherwise) to ever step on the diamond. In 125 career at-bats, he collected 6 hits for a paltry .048 batting average.

He played his last game on September 5, 1919.

After baseball, Klepfer became an independent oil operator and then in 1946 went to work for C.W. Titus, an oilman in Tulsa, Oklahoma. Klepfer died on August 9, 1950, in a hospital in Tulsa. His body was laid to rest at Rose Hill Cemetery.

Major transaction
On August 21, 1915, the White Sox traded Klepfer along with Larry Chappell, Braggo Roth and cash for Shoeless Joe Jackson.

External links

1888 births
1950 deaths
Major League Baseball pitchers
New York Highlanders players
New York Yankees players
Chicago White Sox players
Cleveland Indians players
Baseball players from Pennsylvania
Pennsylvania State University alumni
Penn State Nittany Lions baseball players
Rochester Hustlers players
Venice Tigers players